Super7, also known as S7, was a child boy band from Jakarta, Indonesia, who formed in March 2011. Their most famous single, "BFF (Sahabat)" was released in 2011. They released two studio albums before breaking up in 2015. Some members of the band then formed the new ensemble New Super7. Their fanclubs were known as "Seveners".

History
Super7 formed in 2011 and were signed to Keci Music in August 2011. The band members, who were all child actors, met on set and formed a band, which they named Super7 because there were originally seven of them (Ajil, Bagas, Jose, Bryant, James, Raza, and Karel) and each one had a unique talent. James withdrew early in the band's career in order to focus on school, and was replaced by Bryan Domani. Super7 released their debut album The Adventure of Super7 in 2012, and it was sold primarily in KFC restaurants in Indonesia. The album won the Best Children's Album award at the 16th annual Anugerah Musik Indonesia award ceremony in 2013.

In 2013, the band were cast in Bersama Meraih Mimpi (Achieving dreams together), a musical comedy drama television series. The eponymous soundtrack, Super7's second studio album, was released the same year. In December 2013, Super7 published a special fan book also titled Bersama Meraih Mimpi, documenting the band's journey through the Indonesian music industry.

The group's structure fluctuated around this time, with various temporary members coming and going. On 17 March 2014, Bryant Santoso officially left the band. Two months later, on 3 May 2014, Bryan Domani and Raza Adhanzio also left. Karel Susanteo followed suit on 12 October of the same year. In late 2014, the band's contract with Keci Music came to an end.

In early 2015, the three remaining members of the band (Jose, Ajil, and Bagas) were cast in the soap opera Bidadari Takut Jatuh Cinta. Around this time, Bagas and Jose were planning to release a new single as a duo, but Super7 officially broke up shortly after. The group later reformed as New Super7, with a fresh lineup consisting of Jose Christian, Bagas Dwi Rizqi Hidayat, and Andreas Utomo.

Other ventures
Suka Suka Super Seven Dan Idola Cilik Dalam Habis Gelap Menuju Terang is a feature film starring Super7, Tissa Biani, Mike Lewis, and Denada. The film was created by Geri Busye and released on 7 August 2014.
It was shot on a $300,000 budget, but received negative reviews and performed poorly at the box office, grossing $19,364 in Indonesia and $5,875 abroad. The film was not released in North America.

Members
 James Paul Arthur Awuy (known as James) – sub vocal and sub dancer (2011)
 Bryant Santoso (known as Byant) – sub vocal and sub dancer (2011–2014)
 Bryan Elmi Domani (known as BD) – main vocal and sub dancer (2011–2014)
 Raza Adhanzio (known as Raza) – sub vocal and sub dancer  (2011–2014)
 Karel Susanteo (known as Karel) – sub vocal and sub dancer (2011–2014)
 Abdullah Tsaqib (known as Tsaqib) – sub vocal, sub dancer (2014)
 Alvin Lapian (known as Alvin) – sub vocal and sub dancer (2014–2015)
 Reinhard Jonathan Daniel Poetiray (known as Rheno) – sub vocal and sub dancer  (2014–2015)
 Reynard Gaberial (known as Reynard) – sub vocal and sub dancer  (2014–2015)
 Muhammad Fazzil Alditto (known as Ajil) – sub vocal and sub dancer (2011–2015)
 Bagas Dwi Rizqi Hidayat (known as Bagas) – main rapper, sub vocal and sub dancer (2011–2015)
 Jose Christian (known as Jose) – main vocal and sub dancer (2011–2015)

Discography

Studio albums
 The Adventure of Super7 (2012)
 Bersama Meraih Mimpi (2013)

Singles

Compilation appearances
 KFC Adu Bintang (2013)
 Keci Christmas Song (2013)
 Anak Indonesia (2014)

Music videos
 "Best Friend Forever" (2011) with 7icons
 "Go Green!" (2012)
 "Bersama Meraih Mimpi" (2013)

Books
 Bersama Meraih Mimpi (2013)

Television appearances

See also
 List of Indonesian pop musicians
 Indo pop

References

Indonesian boy bands
Musical groups established in 2011
Indonesian dance music groups
Musical groups from Jakarta
Anugerah Musik Indonesia winners
2011 establishments in Indonesia